An uppercut is a punch used in boxing.

Uppercut may also refer to:
 Uppercut (bridge), a defensive play in contract bridge
 Upper cut, in cricket terminology, a type of batsman's stroke
 "The Uppercut", a song by 2Pac from the album Loyal to the Game 
 The Upper Cuts, a 2005 compilation album by Alan Braxe
 "Uppercut", a song by Stereophonics from Keep Calm and Carry On
 Uppercut (EP), an EP by Canadian singer and songwriter Morgan Finlay

See also
 Undercut (disambiguation)